The 1940 Nevada Wolf Pack football team was an American football team that represented the University of Nevada as an independent during the 1940 college football season. In their second season under head coach Jim Aiken, the team compiled a 4–4–1 record.

Schedule

References

Nevada
Nevada Wolf Pack football seasons
Nevada Wolf Pack football